Kolaras railway station is a railway station on Indore–Gwalior line under the Bhopal railway division of West Central Railway zone. This is situated at Tighariya, Kolaras in Shivpuri district of the Indian state of Madhya Pradesh.

References

Railway stations in Shivpuri district
Bhopal railway division